The Chang FA Cup 2016 is the 23rd season of Thailand knockout football competition. The tournament is organized by the Football Association of Thailand.

Following the death of King Bhumibol Adulyadej, the Football Association of Thailand cancelled the remaining league and cup season on 14 October 2016, stating that the FA Cup winners would be determined by a lottery draw. This was at the semi-final stage of the competition and would determine who would represent Thailand in Asian competition.

The following day however (15 October), FAT appeared to do a U-turn and announced that further discussions with key stake holders would determine whether the league campaign would continue. These discussions were required as teams that were in the relegation places at the time of the original announcement were voicing their concerns.

After the discussions, FAT decided that the four semi-finalists were awarded 2016 Thai FA Cup co-winners. A draw was held among them to select the team that will participate in 2017 AFC Champions League Play-off and was won by Sukhothai, while Chonburi withdrew from the draw.

Calendar

Results

Qualification round 
Qualification round for teams currently playing in the 2016 Thai Division 1 League, Regional League Division 2 and Other CUP level. The Qualification round was held 18 May 2016.

First round 
First round for teams currently playing in the 2016 Thai Premier League, 2016 Thai Division 1 League, Regional League Division 2 and Other CUP level. The first round was held 15 June 2016.

Second round

Third round

Quarter-finals 
Khon Kaen United was suspended from the 2016 campaign due to criminal case with 8 games remaining

Semi-finals 
Following the death of King Bhumibol Adulyadej, the Football Association of Thailand cancelled the remaining matches and the four semi-finalists were awarded co-winners. A draw was held among them to select the team that will participate in 2017 AFC Champions League Play-off and was won by Sukhothai, while Chonburi withdrew from the draw.

See also
 2016 Thai League
 2016 Thai Division 1 League
 2016 Regional League Division 2
 2016 Football Division 3
 2016 Thai League Cup
 2016 Kor Royal Cup

Note

References
 http://www.smmsport.com/reader.php?news=177640
 http://www.thailandsusu.com/webboard/index.php?topic=371043.0
 http://www.smmsport.com/reader.php?news=179311
 http://www.thailandsusu.com/webboard/index.php?topic=372021.0
 http://www.smmsport.com/reader.php?news=181477
 http://www.thailandsusu.com/webboard/index.php?topic=373029.0
 http://www.thailandsusu.com/webboard/index.php?topic=373345.0
 http://www.thailandsusu.com/webboard/index.php?topic=373902.0
 http://www.smmsport.com/reader.php?news=185439

External links
 Official (1)
 Official (2)

2016 in Thai football cups
Thailand FA Cup
Thai FA Cup seasons